The MKEK-1 Gözcü (Turkish - "Observer") was a projected aircraft that was to have provided the Turkish Army with a domestically designed and produced airborne observation post for artillery spotting and general liaison duties. It was the first aircraft design undertaken by MKEK following its acquisition of THK's manufacturing facilities in 1952.

However, the wide availability of the Piper Cub and Super Cub led to the Army's selection of that aircraft instead, and work on the MKEK-1 was abandoned.

Notes

References
 

1950s Turkish military reconnaissance aircraft
Single-engined tractor aircraft
High-wing aircraft
Mechanical and Chemical Industry Corporation aircraft